Two ships of the Royal Navy have borne the name HMS St Joseph:

 was an 8-gun sloop captured in 1696 and sold in 1699.
 was a 4-gun hoy purchased in 1704 and sold in 1710.

See also
 was a 114-gun first rate captured from the Spanish in 1797.  She was used as a gunnery training ship from 1837 and was broken up in 1849.

Royal Navy ship names